Gillis Rombouts (1630, Haarlem – 1678, Haarlem), was a Dutch Golden Age landscape painter.

Biography
According to the RKD he painted landscapes and beach scenes. He was followed by his son, the painter Salomon Rombouts.

References

Gillis Rombouts on Artnet

1630 births
1678 deaths
Dutch Golden Age painters
Dutch male painters
Dutch landscape painters
Artists from Haarlem